Rhodes Stadium is an 11,250-seat multi-purpose stadium in Elon, North Carolina. Named for trustee Dusty Rhodes, his wife, Peggy, and their family, the stadium opened in 2001 and is home to the Elon University Phoenix football team.  The stadium also hosts soccer games on occasion.

Before Rhodes Stadium was built Elon played in Burlington at Burlington Memorial Stadium.

See also
 List of NCAA Division I FCS football stadiums

References

External links
Elon Athletics Site

College football venues
American football venues in North Carolina
Elon Phoenix football
Soccer venues in North Carolina
Multi-purpose stadiums in the United States
Sports venues in Alamance County, North Carolina
Sports venues completed in 2001
2001 establishments in North Carolina